Toivo Joel Rinne (6 June 1897, Asikkala – 3 December 1981) was a prolific Finnish actor of stage and screen. Among his most memorable film parts was the title role in the Inspector Palmu movie series, which started in 1960's Komisario Palmun erehdys, and continued in three sequels. Another well-known role in Joel Rinne is in the 1970 film Päämaja, directed by Matti Kassila, in which Rinne interprets in the role of Marshal Mannerheim.

Joel Rinne also appeared on the radio. In the 1960's Finnish-language audio drama version of Gestatten, mein Name ist Cox ("Good Evening, My Name Is Cox"), he played the title character, the adventurer Paul Cox. In the Paul Temple audio drama series, he was also in the title role.

Joel Rinne was married twice. His first wife was actor Rosi Helminen (1896–1964) and his second Saga Rikberg (1908–1983). Rinne were three daughters: Saara Liisa, Kirsti and Lena, of whom Kirsti died as a child. The marriage with Helminen in 1924 ended in divorce in 1934, but the alliance with Rikberg lasted from 1936 until Rinne's death.

Filmography

 Se parhaiten nauraa, joka viimeksi nauraa (1921), Drunk
 Kiljusen pojat koulussa (1921)
 Koskenlaskijan morsian (1923), Lumberjack
 Rautakylän vanha parooni (1923), Reverend Richard von Dahlen
 Murtovarkaus (1926)
 Nuori luotsi (1928)
 Miekan terällä (1928)
 Aatamin puvussa ja vähän Eevankin (1931), Aarne Himanen
 Rovastin häämätkat (1931), Viljo
 Olenko minä tullut haaremiin! (1932), Arvi Halmenheimo
 Minä ja ministeri (1934), Raimo Vehari
 Meidän poikamme ilmassa - me maassa (1934), Jarmo Kurki
 VMV 6 (1936), Olavi Manner
 Ja alla oli tulinen järvi (1937), Jussi Raala
 Kuin uni ja varjo (1937), Juho
 Tulitikkuja lainaamassa (1938), Ville Kettunen
 Olenko minä tullut haaremiin (1938), Arvi Halmenheimo
 Syyllisiäkö? (1938), Aarre Einola
 Nummisuutarit (1938), Mikko Vilkastus
 Halveksittu (1939), Thure Gavelius
 Seitsemän veljestä (1939), Timo
 Suotorpan tyttö (1940), Pekka Martikainen
 SF-paraati (1940), Jopi Rintee
 Perheen musta lammas (1941), Erkki Rautia
 Jos oisi valtaa (1941), Gunnar Berg
 Suomisen perhe (1941), Sam Nelson
 Poikamies-pappa (1941), Jopi
 Täysosuma (1941), Erkki Kaipio
 Kuollut mies rakastuu (1942), Colonel Rainer Sarmo
 Yli rajan (1942), Mikko Vanhala
 Syntynyt terve tyttö (1943), Kustaa Helasuo
 Miehen kunnia (1943), Kaarlo Auer
 Kirkastettu sydän (1943), Ahti Helpi
 Kuollut mies vihastuu (1944), Colonel Rainer Sarmo
 Kartanon naiset (1944), Jukka Kaplas
 Kolmastoista koputus (1945), Pentti Kalho
 Valkoisen neilikan velho (1945), Lauri Liesi
 Hedelmätön puu (1947), Taunu Sysikorpi
 Pikku-Matti maailmalla (1947), Taneli Parma
 Kilroy sen teki (1948), Yrjö Haara
 Hormoonit valloillaan (1948), Väinö Kehkonen
 Kalle-Kustaa Korkin seikkailut (1949), Kalle-Kustaa Korkki
 Isäpappa ja keltanokka (1950), Yrjö Tammela
 Tapahtui kaukana (1950), Research engineer
 Yhden yön hinta (1952), Punapää
 Kuollut mies kummittelee (1952), Colonel Rainer Sarmo
 Huhtikuu tulee (1953), Heikki Avovirta
 Tyttö kuunsillalta (1953), Erik Ramberg
 Niskavuoren Aarne (1954)
 Rakas lurjus (1955), Jussi Siimes
 Tyttö tuli taloon (1956), Saku
 Muuan sulhasmies (1956), Moppe
 Niskavuori taistelee (1957), Artturi Santala
 Pekka ja Pätkä mestarimaalareina (1959)
 Komisario Palmun erehdys (1960), Inspector Frans J. Palmu
 Kaasua, komisario Palmu! (1961), Inspector Frans J. Palmu
 Kultainen vasikka (1961)
 Tähdet kertovat, komisario Palmu (1962), Inspector Frans J. Palmu
 Kustaa III (1963), General Pechlin
 Vodkaa, komisario Palmu (1969), Inspector Frans J. Palmu
 Päämaja (1970), Commander-in-Chief Marshal Mannerheim

References

External links

1897 births
1981 deaths
People from Asikkala
People from Häme Province (Grand Duchy of Finland)
Finnish male stage actors
Finnish male film actors
Finnish male silent film actors
20th-century Finnish male actors
Finnish military personnel of World War II